Martyr Dr. Thabet Thabet Government Hospital or Tulkarm Governmental Hospital is a government hospital in the Tulkarm city, West Bank, Palestine. Followed by the Palestinian Ministry of Health. It was built in 2004 and has 158 medical beds. It employs 317 staff, including a doctor, nurse, pharmacist, physiotherapist, laboratory technician, radiologist and others.

References 

Hospitals in Tulkarm